Othman Kechrid (26 June 1920 – 23 February 2021) was a Tunisian politician.

Biography
Kechrid attended primary school in Hajeb El Ayoun and secondary school in Sousse. In 1942, he graduated from the École normale supérieure de Tunisie and became a primary school teacher. He also joined the Neo Destour party, which sought to gain independence from France. In 1944, he became a math and science teacher at the Cours complémentaire de Kairouan. In 1949, he began studying law. On 16 November 1953, he began working at the General Secretariat and became chief of staff to the Minister of Finance, the first to hold the title since Tunisian independence. On 16 January 1961, he was appointed Deputy Director of External Finances.

Ahmed Ben Salah, former Secretary of State of the Economy, discussed Kechrid's departure from the office with the following statement: "Othman Kechrid, director of the Trade Office, one day came to see me to hand in his resignation because Béchir Zerglayoun had arrived in his office, asking him for favors, playing his revolver". In 1967, he became trade director and deputy general manager of the company El Bouniane. On 3 July 1973, he became Secretary General of the Ministry of the Interior, a position in which he launched a computerization program for the ministry's administration.

On 8 November 1979, he became Minister of the Interior, serving until 1 March 1980, when he was succeeded by Driss Guiga. On 23 October 1980, he became a technical advisor to President Bourguiba.

Aside from his political career, Kechrid founded several companies, including Ellouhoum, Ethimar, the Société des articles populaires, Société de cellulose de Kasserine, and a dozen other regional corporations. He was also a member of Les Scouts Tunisiens.

Othman Kechrid died on 23 February 2021 at the age of 100.

References

1920 births
2021 deaths
Tunisian politicians
Tunisian centenarians
Men centenarians